Joaquín León Milans del Bosch y Carrió (6 June 1854 – 31 August 1936) was a Spanish military officer. The change in ideological orientation of the Milans del Bosch family was completed with his generation; traditionally, they had been liberal military officers, but during the twentieth century they aligned themselves with conservative forces.

Biography

Early life 
His father died when he was three years old. He was raised under the protection of his uncle, Lorenzo Milans del Bosch. He joined the cavalry army at a young age, lived through the Bourbon restoration and embraced the cause of Alfonso XII.

Military career 
Milans del Bosch fought in the Third Carlist War in 1893, and in the Tagalog War in the Philippines from 1897 to 1898, where he coincided with the future dictator Miguel Primo de Rivera. Following the signing of the Pact of Biak-na-Bato, he returned to Spain where, after a few different military and diplomatic posts, he was named assistant to King Alfonso XIII, and raised to the palatial class of honorary royal servants of the Royal Household and Heritage of the Crown of Spain, the Gentlemen of the Bedchamber.

He was later posted to Madrid and Morocco, where he was elevated to the rank of lieutenant general.

Captain General of Catalonia 
On 30 September 1918, Milans del Bosch was named Captain General of Catalonia. The situation in Catalonia was tense due to the economic crisis caused by the halt of exportations to belligerent countries and by risen prices. The workers' movement—led by the National Confederation of Labour—organized itself and fought the gunmen of the Employers' Association. Milans gave his support to the employers' association and used military methods to repress social conflicts in what is known as the Canadiense strike.

During his tenure, he was invited to ceremonies and wedding banquets by the Barcelona aristocracy.

Civil Governor of Barcelona 
Together with the minister of governance and the Captain General of Catalonia, he carried out a fierce anti-Catalanist campaign.

In 1925, he ordered the closure of FC Barcelona's stadium, Camp Nou, as well as closure of the Orfeó Català; he banned Catalan cultural organizations and suspended publication of Catalan newspapers and magazines. He was removed from office upon the fall of the dictatorship on 18 February 1930.

Later life and execution 
From October 1927 to February 1930, Milans del Bosch was appointed to the National Advisory Assembly of Primo de Rivera's dictatorship.

Milans del Bosch chose not to leave Madrid after the attempted  of 18 July 1936 that started the Spanish Civil War, as his son Mariano had been detained – though he had the option to take refuge in the Turkish embassy. He was detained by militiamen on 30 August, and executed the following day on Fernando el Santo Street in Madrid's district of Chamberí.

References

Footnotes

Sources 
Books

Newspapers

External links 
 

1854 births
1936 deaths
Captains General of Catalonia
Civil governors of Barcelona
Executed military personnel
Executed Spanish people
Honorary Knights Commander of the Royal Victorian Order
People from Barcelona
People killed by the Second Spanish Republic
People killed in the Spanish Civil War
Spanish diplomats
Spanish generals
Spanish military personnel of the Third Carlist War (Governmental faction)